Hellalive is the first live album by American heavy metal band Machine Head.

The album was released to fulfill Machine Head's commitment to Roadrunner Records (the band released Through the Ashes of Empires shortly after). Former Vio-lence guitarist Phil Demmel is present on "None But My Own" and "The Burning Red", in place of Ahrue Luster, due to these songs being taken from 2002's Full Force Festival and by that time Luster had left the band. Demmel filled in, as is credited in the liner notes to "Hellalive" and he later joined the band as permanent lead guitarist. As of 2012 the album has sold over 38,000 copies in the United States and an estimated 78,000 copies worldwide since its 2003 release.

Track listing

Machine Head
Robb Flynn – vocals, rhythm guitar
Adam Duce – bass
Dave McClain – drums
Ahrue Luster – lead guitar (tracks 1–7, 9–11, 13 and 14)
Phil Demmel – lead guitar (tracks 8 and 12 only)

Chart positions

References

2003 live albums
Machine Head (band) albums
Roadrunner Records live albums
Albums recorded at the Brixton Academy